In mathematical logic, specifically computability theory, a function   is sequentially computable if, for every computable sequence   of real numbers, the sequence   is also computable.

A function   is effectively uniformly continuous if there exists a recursive function   such that, if

then

A real function is computable if it is both sequentially computable and effectively uniformly continuous,

These definitions can be generalized to functions of more than one variable or functions only defined on a subset of   The generalizations of the latter two need not be restated. A suitable generalization of the first definition is:

Let  be a subset of   A function   is sequentially computable if, for every -tuplet   of computable sequences of real numbers such that

the sequence   is also computable.

References

Computable analysis